Induvadana is a 2022 Indian Telugu-language horror comedy drama film directed by M. Srinivas Raju from the story written by Aketi Sathish. The film features Varun Sandesh and Farnaz Shetty in lead roles. Induvadana was released theatrically on 1 January 2022.

Plot

Cast 

 Varun Sandesh as Vasu
 Farnaz Shetty as Indu
 Raghu Babu
 Ali
 Dhanraj
 Praveen Raj
 Parvateesam
 Mahesh Vitta
 Surekha Vani
 Nagineedu
 Jyoti Labala
 Duvvasi Mohan
 Thagubothu Ramesh
 Baby Krithika
 Ambarushi
 Vamsi Aketi
 Jabardast Mohan

Production 
This film marks the return of Varun Sandhesh after a hiatus.

Soundtrack

Reception 
123Telugu gave a rating of 2.5 out of 5 and wrote that "MSR took an intense story but failed to elevate it much". Giving the same rating, Sakshi Post praised the concept but criticized the narration. They further appreciated the performances of Varun and Farnaz. News18 Telugu praised Varun's performance but gave mixed review on the screenplay and other technical aspects.

References 
2022 films
Films set in 1994

External links 

 

2022 comedy horror films
2022 comedy-drama films
Indian comedy horror films
Indian comedy-drama films
Indian films about revenge
2020s Telugu-language films